Sjeng Schalken defeated Tommy Haas 6–4, 6–4 to win the 1999 Heineken Open singles competition. Marcelo Ríos was the defending champion.

Seeds
A champion seed is indicated in bold text while text in italics indicates the round in which that seed was eliminated.

  Marcelo Ríos (first round)
  Félix Mantilla (semifinals)
  Wayne Ferreira (first round)
  Byron Black (first round)
  Tommy Haas (final)
  Fabrice Santoro (first round)
  Vincent Spadea (first round)
  Dominik Hrbatý (quarterfinals)

Draw

External links
 ATP Singles draw

Singles
ATP Auckland Open